Anselm (died 805) was the Lombard  Duke of Friuli in the northeastern part of Lombard Italy, 

He left the world at the height of his secular career, and in 750 built a monastery at Fanano, a place given to him by Aistulf, King of the Lombards, who had married Anselm's sister Gisaltruda. Two years later he built the monastery of Nonantula, a short distance northeast of Modena, which Aistulf endowed. Anselm went to Rome, where Pope Stephen III invested him with the habit of Saint Benedict, gave him some relics of Saint Sylvester and appointed him Abbot of Nonantula.  Anselm founded many hospices where the poor and the sick were sheltered and cared for by monks. 

According to the twelfth-century Catalogus abbatum nonantulorum, a list of abbots of Nonantola with their histories, Desiderius, who succeeded Aistulf as King of the Lombards in 756, banished Anselm from Nonantula in favor of his own protégé. Anselm spent the seven years of his exile at the Benedictine monastery of Monte Cassino, but returned to Nonantula after Desiderius was taken prisoner by Charlemagne in the war of 774. This exile is not mentioned the earlier Vita Anselmi, a biography of Anselm written one or two hundred years after his death. Until 1083, Nonantula was an imperial monastery, and after Anselm's time its discipline often suffered from imperial interference in the election of its abbots.

Having been abbot for fifty years, Anselm died at Nonantula in 805, where the commune still honors him as patron. His feast day is 3 March.

References

Sources
Paul the Deacon. Historia Langobardorum.

Dukes of Friuli
Italian abbots
8th-century Christian saints
Burials at Nonantola Abbey
8th-century births
805 deaths
Medieval Italian saints
Italian Benedictines
Benedictine abbots
Benedictine saints
8th-century Lombard people
Italian Christian monks